Phesates is a genus of longhorn beetles of the subfamily Lamiinae, containing the following species:

 Phesates ferrugatus Pascoe, 1865
 Phesates uniformis Breuning, 1938

References

Pteropliini